Denis Dolecsko (born 5 December 1903, date of death unknown) was a Romanian fencer. He competed at the 1928 and 1936 Summer Olympics.

References

1903 births
Year of death missing
Romanian male fencers
Olympic fencers of Romania
Fencers at the 1928 Summer Olympics
Fencers at the 1936 Summer Olympics